SIX Interbank Clearing AG (before November 2008: Swiss Interbank Clearing AG), based in Zurich, Switzerland, is a subsidiary of SIX Group.

Since 1987 SIX Interbank Clearing has operated on behalf of the Swiss National Bank a payment platform for the processing of domestic and international payments (clearing) in Swiss francs and, since the introduction of the euro, also of payments in euros. This platform - which includes the Swiss Interbank Clearing system for francs and euroSIC for euros - connects virtually all Swiss financial institutions and a number of banks outside Switzerland. This makes it possible for financial institutions worldwide to handle electronic payments in euros and Swiss francs in Switzerland around the clock in real time.

activities 

SIX Interbank Clearing also participates in various committees to standardize national and international payments (IBAN and SEPA).

SIX Interbank Clearing also maintains the tables, history and ongoing discussion for ISO 4217, the ISO standard that defines international currency codes.

References

External links 
 http://www.six-interbank-clearing.com/en/home/payment-services/sic.html
 http://www.six-interbank-clearing.com/en/home/payment-services/eurosic.html

Banking in Switzerland